Cancellopollia gracilis is a species of sea snail, a marine gastropod mollusk in the family Pisaniidae, the true whelks and the like.

Description
The snail shells are cream coloured.

Distribution
This marine species occurs off New Caledonia.

References

 Vermeij G.J. & Bouchet P. 1998. New Pisaniinae (Mollusca, Gastropoda, Buccinidae) from New Caledonia, with remarks on Cantharus and related genera. Zoosystema 20(3): 471-485

External links

Pisaniidae
Gastropods described in 1998